Ptychadena uzungwensis is a species of frog in the family Ptychadenidae. It is found on the East African Plateau in Rwanda, Burundi, and Tanzania in the north and then southward to eastern Democratic Republic of the Congo, northern Angola, Zambia, Malawi, Zimbabwe and uplands of Mozambique. Its common names include Udzungwa ridged frog and Udzungwa grass frog, where "Udzungwa" may also be written Uzungwa, following the spelling that Arthur Loveridge used in the species description for the Udzungwa Mountains, the type locality.

Description
The longitudinal ridges on the dorsum are broken, and there are two distinct ridges on the snout. There are light dorsolateral skin folds running along each side of the body. The dorsum is dark brown with darker brown spots, and there is a light mid-dorsal stripe. The back of the thigh is faintly spotted, but may in some individuals join to form a horizontal band. Males have yellow throats and yellow patches near the groin. The toes have reduced webbing.

Habitat and conservation
Ptychadena uzungwensis lives in medium- to high-altitude grasslands ( above sea level) near pools, seepages, dambos and permanent sponges, its presumed breeding habitat. Male call from shallow water. Specific threats to this species are not known, but it is unlikely to face significant threats. It occurs in a number protected areas, including the Upemba National Park in the southeastern Democratic Republic of Congo.

References

uzungwensis
Frogs of Africa
Amphibians of Angola
Amphibians of Burundi
Amphibians of the Democratic Republic of the Congo
Amphibians of Malawi
Amphibians of Mozambique
Amphibians of Rwanda
Amphibians of Tanzania
Amphibians of Zambia
Amphibians of Zimbabwe
Taxa named by Arthur Loveridge
Amphibians described in 1932
Taxonomy articles created by Polbot